Lishu District is a district of the city of Jixi, Heilongjiang, People's Republic of China.

Administrative divisions 
Lishu District is divided into 5 subdistricts and 1 township. 
5 subdistricts
 Jieli, Muleng, Pinggang, Jianchang, Shilin
1 town
 Lishu

Notes and references 

Lishu